Jambonneau is a French culinary term for the knuckle end of a leg of pork or ham. It is consumed fresh, salted or smoked. In addition, after braising or  poaching, jambonneau is traditionally served with sauerkraut or used in soups.

The same term may also be used for a chicken thigh that has been stuffed, usually with forcemeat, shaped like a ham and braised. Such a preparation is called jambonneau as it has a shape similar to the pork or ham form.

References 

French chicken dishes
French cuisine
Pork dishes
Culinary terminology